Kowanyama is a town and coastal locality in the Aboriginal Shire of Kowanyama, Queensland, Australia. 

It is the site of the former Mitchell River Mission, founded in 1916, after the nearby  Trubanamen Mission (established not far away on Topsy Creek in 1905) was abandoned.

Geography
The locality is on the Cape York Peninsula. It is bounded to the west by the  Gulf of Carpentaria and to the north by the Coleman River.

The Mitchell River enters the locality from the west (Maramie) and exits to the north-west into the Gulf of Carpentaria.

The Aboriginal people who live in this community include people from the Kokominjena, Kokoberra and Kunjen groups of the Yir-Yoront people. In the Yir-Yoront language, Kowanyama means "The place of many waters".

Kowanyama is accessed by an all-weather airstrip, as well as unsealed roads in the dry season from Pormpuraaw to the north, Normanton to the south and Cairns to the east.

History
Kunjen (also known as Koko Wanggara, Ngundjan and Olkola) is a language of Western Cape York. The Kunjen language region includes the landscape within the local government boundaries of Kowanyama Community Council and Cook Shire Council.

Kowanyama State School opened in January 1904. Since the beginning of 2014, the school has also started to enrol students in a year 11 and 12 pathways program.

In 1905, Trubanamen Mission was established inland on Topsy Creek, and Aboriginal peoples of the region were gradually drawn from their ancestral lands into the mission settlement. Later, in 1916, Mitchell River Mission was founded on the present site of Kowanyama and the Trubanamen site abandoned. Some people continued to live on their traditional lands, only moving into Kowanyama in the 1940s.

In 1964, a cyclone destroyed the mission.  The Queensland government funded the rebuilding.

Kowanyama Post Office opened by 1967.

In 1967 the Anglican church were no longer able to sustain their activities in the area as a Church Mission. The Department of Aboriginal and Islander Affairs, a government department, under the Act continued running the affairs of the community.

The deed covered the traditional lands of the people of Kowanyama. Like other DOGIT communities of the time, Kowanyama had a town Council elected by Aboriginal people living in the community. The newly formed Kowanyama Council assumed responsibility for implementing certain conditions of the DOGIT. Seven elected aboriginal residents hold three-year terms in office.

Since the 1990s, many Kowanyama people have been returning to their ancestral lands through the Homelands Movement.  Homelands within the Kowanyama DOGIT include Scrubby Bore, Red Lilly, Ten Mile, Shelfo, Stewart Place, Old Rodeo Ground, Kowanyumal, Duck Hole, Wonya Bore, Kokomenjen Island, Wallaby Island, Joe's Lagoon, Yangr Bore, Engkoram, Fish Hole, Robert Demaine great elder and Thilpi.

Other homelands, including the Oriners Pastoral Lease and the Sefton Pastoral Lease, were independently purchased by the Kowanyama Council and are located outside the DOGIT boundary.

At the 2006 census, the town of Kowanyama had a population of 1,017.

Culture 
Kowanyama is one of the largest communities on the Cape York Peninsula. Kowanyama's Aboriginal people continue to identify strongly with their ancestral countries and with the languages, stories, songs, dances, and histories associated with those countries. Language groups associated with countries in the Kowanyama region are Yir Yoront, Yirrk Thangalkl, Koko Bera, Uw Oykangand, and Olkola.

Education
Kowanyama State School is a government primary and secondary (Early Childhood-10) school for boys and girls at 345 Kowanyama Street. In 2018, the school had an enrolment of 190 students with 21 teachers and 3 non-teaching staff. It includes a special education program.

Secondary education to Year 12 is not available in Kowanyama nor nearby. Distance education and boarding schools are the options.

Shopping

Kowanyama has a small supermarket that sells fresh foods, packaged and frozen foods, and hardware items.  The store is similar to a medium-sized IGA store.  The store is operated by Department of Aboriginal and Torres Strait Islander Partnerships (DATSIP), and the manager is able to obtain any goods that are not normally kept for sale.  The store prices are somewhat higher than provincial towns, which reflect the high costs of transport and storage.

The "Coffee Shop" does not sell coffee; operated by the Anglican Church, it stocks take away food, entertainment media and small goods.

Accommodation

Kowanyama River House is a 17-room guest house overlooking Magnificent Creek in Kowanyama Township. The guest house is located 100 metres from the Cultural Centre and 200 metres from the Kowanyama Aboriginal Shire Council offices and Supermarket.

Alcohol restrictions

Kowanyama community is subject to strict alcohol restrictions enforced by police prohibiting individuals holding any alcohol, and prohibiting any vehicles carrying alcohol anywhere within the community.

Kowanyama Aboriginal Shire Council originally held a liquor licence allowing light beer to be consumed on the premises of the Kowanyama Canteen at specified times, but this was suspended by Queensland's Liquor Licensing Commission and Queensland Treasurer, Andrew Fraser, in February 2008.

The decision to suspend Kowanyama Aboriginal Shire Council's liquor licence is claimed to have resulted in the Council losing a business valued at $1.6 million, plus up to $120,000 in stock. As a consequence, on 30 October 2008, the Council went to Queensland's Supreme Court to challenge the liquor licensing decisions as racially discriminatory.

Languages 
Yir Yiront (also known as Yiront, Jirjoront, Yir-yiront, and Kokomindjan) is an Australian Aboriginal language. Its traditional language region is in Western Cape York within the local government areas of  Aboriginal Shire of Kowanyama and Shire of Cook, in the catchments of the  Coleman River and Mitchell River. Following the removal of Aboriginal people from their traditional lands, it is also spoken in Pormpuraaw and Kowanyama.

Climate
 
Kowanyama experiences a tropical savanna climate (Köppen climate classification Aw). The wet season runs from December to April and is characterized by frequent torrential downpours and high humidity. During the dry season, almost no rain falls and days are warm to hot but humidity is low and the nights can become quite mild.

Residents were confined to their houses for almost two weeks; however no major damage was reported.

Travel
Kowanyama is serviced weekly in the dry season by road trains from Cairns. The service becomes more frequent as the wet season approaches.

Early storms in October can make the  dirt road to Chillagoe east of the community subject to flooding. By late December the storms of the monsoons have usually arrived, isolating the community by road.

The monsoons are regarded as the arrival of nhawrr yirrpa, the Rainbow Snake who brings the life giving water to the land. During the wet season, which may last until May, the community is serviced only by aircraft, as all other access is restricted. During the wet season, fresh foods and perishables are flown into the community each week on charter planes by stores in town.

See also
 Aboriginal Shire of Kowanyama
 Yir-Yoront language

Further reading
 Moran, Mark 2006 PhD Chapter on Kowanyama reviewing Kowanyama's ethnographic materials and detailing Kowanyama's institutional structure, services, and local governance arrangements Accessed 25 January 2009 
 Monaghan, James (2005) ‘Our Way': social space and the geography of land allocation practice on the southern Gulf Lowlands of Cape York Peninsula. PhD thesis, James Cook University.Accessed 26 January 2009 
 Ethnologue.com entry for the Kunjun Language indigenous to the Kowanyama area Accessed 6 November 2008 
 Queensland Government Department of Communities 'Descriptive Data on Cape York Communities including Kowanyama Accessed 6 November 2008 
  Sharp, Nonie (1998) Reimagining Northern Seascapes in Australia: Open Access, Common Property and the Return of Responsibility? (Reference to Kowanyama on Pg 6) Accessed 6 November 2008

References

External links

"I belong student clip - Kowanyama" brief video on growing up in Kowanyama Accessed 25 January 2009
 Our World 2.0 Our World 2 Video & Video Brief on Saltwater vs Freshwater Changes around Kowanyama Accessed 21 January 2009
 Peta Hill 'Aboriginal Station Life' on-line photo collection of people and places around Kowanyama. Accessed 25 January 2009
 Story Place: Indigenous Art of Cape York web page on "Kowanyama" Accessed 9 November 2008 
 Our World 2.0  United Nations University's 'Kowanyama Climate Change' video brief Accessed 19 November 2008 
 World Wildlife Funds' News Archive 2001 Article on Kowanyama Cultural and Natural Resource Mapping Project Accessed 6 November 2008 

Towns in Queensland
Populated places in Far North Queensland
Aboriginal communities in Queensland
Coastline of Queensland
Aboriginal Shire of Kowanyama
Localities in Queensland